Erzbach is a river of the state Styria in Austria. It is a right tributary of the Enns at Hieflau.

References

Rivers of Styria
Rivers of Austria